The 2015 Washington State Cougars football team represented Washington State University during the 2015 NCAA Division I FBS football season. The team was coached by fourth-year head coach Mike Leach and played their home games at Martin Stadium in Pullman, Washington. They were members of the North Division of the Pac-12 Conference. They finished the season 9–4, 6–3 in Pac-12 play to finish in third place in the North Division. They were invited to the Sun Bowl where they defeated the Miami Hurricanes.

Previous season

Schedule

Rankings

Game summaries

Portland State

@ Rutgers

Wyoming

@ California

@ Oregon

Oregon State

@ Arizona

Stanford

Arizona State

@ UCLA

Colorado

@ Washington

vs. Miami (FL)

2015 Coaching staff
Mike Leach - Head Coach/Offensive Coordinator
Jim Mastro - Running Backs
David Yost - Inside Receivers
Graham Harrell - Outside Receivers
Clay McGuire - Offensive Line
Joe Salave'a - Assistant Head Coach/Defensive Line
David Lose - Defensive Quality Control
Alex Grinch - Defensive Coordinator/Secondary
Ken Wilson - Linebackers
Roy Manning - Outside Linebackers
Brian Odom - Defensive Quality Control
Eric Mele - Special Teams
Dave Emerick - Chief of Staff
Antonio Huffman - Director of Football Operations
Jason Loscalzo - Strength and Conditioning

References

Washington State
Washington State Cougars football seasons
Sun Bowl champion seasons
Washington State Cougars football